Jasmine Birtles is a financial and business journalist, author and presenter.

She has made appearances on several British television programmes, principally addressing financial and property matters from the point of view of the consumer.

Financial journalism

Broadcast media
Birtles presented debt documentary The Insider for Channel 4. She is a financial commentator for This Morning, Good Morning Britain, BBC News, Channel 4 News, Channel 5 News and The Wright Stuff. She is also a regular guest on radio programmes including the BBC's You and Yours, Steve Wright in the Afternoon, Radio 2, Radio 5 Live and BBC local radio and commercial stations.

Writing
Birtles has monthly money columns in Reader's Digest, Closer magazine, and Prima Baby. She has written for a number of other newspapers and magazines in the past. In addition, she has written several e-books, and almost forty physical books, including the best seller A Little Book of Abuse (2000, Boxtree) and her latest publication Beat the Banks! (2010, Vermilion). Other titles include:
A Woman's Little Instruction Book (1995, Boxtree)
Do You Still Miss Your Ex-Husband? Yes But My Aim Is Improving. (1996, O'Mara)
A Parent's Little Instruction Book (1996, Boxtree)
1001 Knock Knock Jokes (1998, Robinson)
The Little Book of Excuses (2001, Boxtree)
A Girl's Best Friend Is Her Money (2002, Boxtree)
A Little Book of More Abuse (2002, Boxtree)
A Bit on the Side, 500 Ways to Boost your Income (2005, Piatkus)
Money Book: Control Your Money, Control Your Life (2006, Piatkus)
The Money Magpie (2009, Vermilion)

Public speaking
As a public speaker Birtles has spoken at conferences for a wide variety of companies and organisations.

She performed a one-woman show – a humorous take on money management –  at the Edinburgh Festival Fringe in 2005, called "How to be Rich Without Really Trying".

Travel writing
Birtles is on the expert panel for The Sunday Times Travel Magazine, a columnist for Family Traveler and regularly writes about travel on Moneymagpie.com.

Background
Birtles attended Brighton and Hove High School. She won a scholarship to read English at Christ's College, Cambridge, where she was a member of Cambridge Footlights and performed with the Cambridge University Light Entertainment Society. After university performed briefly as an actress and toured with a production of Don't Dress for Dinner. She occasionally performs stand-up comedy. She once compered her own comedy club, The Giggling Elk.

References

External links
 Jasmine Birtles Official website
 Moneymagpie
 raw – money BBC
 
 June Ford-Crush, Agent
 A.M.Heath, Literary Agent

BBC newsreaders and journalists
Edinburgh Festival performers
Alumni of Christ's College, Cambridge
British television personalities
Living people
Place of birth missing (living people)
British writers
Year of birth missing (living people)